Albert Eugene "Fuzz" White (June 27, 1916 – April 24, 2003) was a Major League Baseball center fielder who played for the St. Louis Browns (1940) and New York Giants (1947). His career was unusual in that he went almost seven years between major league appearances.

During World War II, White served in the Army.

White made his first two major league appearances (September, 1940) as a pinch-hitter, going 0-for-2.  Six years later, on November 1, 1946 he was drafted by the New York Giants from the Browns in the 1946 rule V draft. Then, next season, at the age of 31, he played in seven games for the Giants. At the plate he went 3-for-13 with three runs scored, and on defense recorded 11 putouts with no errors.
   
White died in his hometown of Springfield, Missouri, at the age of 86.

References

External links

1916 births
2003 deaths
Major League Baseball right fielders
Baseball players from Missouri
St. Louis Browns players
New York Giants (NL) players
United States Army personnel of World War II